Jaree Patthaarath (born 13 May 1957) is a Thai sprinter. She competed in the women's 4 × 100 metres relay at the 1984 Summer Olympics.

References

External links
 

1957 births
Living people
Athletes (track and field) at the 1984 Summer Olympics
Jaree Patthaarath
Jaree Patthaarath
Place of birth missing (living people)
Asian Games medalists in athletics (track and field)
Jaree Patthaarath
Athletes (track and field) at the 1982 Asian Games
Athletes (track and field) at the 1986 Asian Games
Medalists at the 1982 Asian Games
Medalists at the 1986 Asian Games
Olympic female sprinters
Jaree Patthaarath
Jaree Patthaarath
Southeast Asian Games medalists in athletics
Jaree Patthaarath